General Altmayer may refer to:

René Altmayer (1882–1976), French Army general
Robert Altmayer (1875–1959), French Army general
Victor Joseph Altmayer (1844–1908), French Army general